The 2020s saw a blossoming of LGBTQ characters in animated series, including in children's animation, adult animation, young adult animation, and anime. This includes series such as Kipo and the Age of Wonderbeasts, The Owl House, Helluva Boss, Star Trek: Lower Decks, Adventure Time: Distant Lands, and The Great North. Anime such as Adachi and Shimamura,  Assault Lily Bouquet, My Next Life as a Villainess: All Routes Lead to Doom!, and Otherside Picnic also featured LGBTQ characters.

This list only includes recurring characters, otherwise known as supporting characters, which appear frequently from time to time during the series' run, often playing major roles in more than one episode, and those in the main cast are listed below. LGBTQ characters which are guest stars or one-off characters are listed on the pages focusing exclusively on gay (in animation and anime), lesbian (in animation and anime), bisexual (in animation and anime), trans, pansexual, asexual, non-binary, and intersex characters.

The entries on this page are organized alphanumerically by duration dates and then alphabetically by the first letter of a specific series.

2020

2021

2022

2023

See also

 List of animated films with LGBT characters
 List of LGBT-related films by year
 List of yuri works

Notes

References

LGBT
2020s-related lists
Lists of LGBT-related television shows
LGBT 2020s
 2020s
2020s LGBT-related television series